The 2018–19 season is Paris Saint-Germain Féminine's 48th season since its creation in 1971, and its 32nd season in the top-flight of women's football in France.

Players

Out on loan

Transfers
Note:  indicates a mid-season transfer.

In

Out

Pre-season and friendlies

Statistics

|-
! colspan="12" style="background:#dcdcdc; text-align:center"| Goalkeepers

|-
! colspan="12" style="background:#dcdcdc; text-align:center"| Defenders

|-
! colspan="12" style="background:#dcdcdc; text-align:center"| Midfielders

|-
! colspan="12" style="background:#dcdcdc; text-align:center"| Forwards

|-
! colspan="12" style="background:#dcdcdc; text-align:center"| Players transferred/loaned out during the season

References

Paris Saint-Germain Féminine seasons